Acanthodactylus busacki, called commonly Busack's fringe-fingered lizard, is a species of lizard in the family Lacertidae. The species is endemic to northwestern Africa.

Etymology
The specific name, busacki, is in honor of American herpetologist Stephen D. Busack (born 1944).

Geographic range
A. busacki is found in Morocco and Western Sahara.

Habitat

Description
Adult males are reddish on the posterior throat, neck, anterior body and belly, and forelimbs.

Reproduction
A. busacki is oviparous.

References

Further reading
Salvador, Alfredo (1982). "A revision of the lizards of the genus Acanthodactylus (Sauria: Lacertidae)". Bonner Zoologische Monographien (16): 1–167. (Acanthodactylus busacki, new species, pp. 88–92, Map 18, Figures 45–49). (in English, with an abstract in German).
Schlüter U (2009). "Fransenfingereidechsen (Acanthodactylus) in der Natur und im Terrarium. Teil 4. Die Acanthodactylus pardalis-Gruppe ". Reptilia (Münster) 14 (76): 52–60. (in German).
Tamar, Karin; Geniez, Philippe; Brito, José C., Crochet, Pierre-André (2017). "Systematic revision of Acanthodactylus busacki (Squamata: Lacertidae) with a description of a new species from Morocco". Zootaxa 4276 (3): 357–386.
Trape, Jean-François; Trape, Sébastien; Chirio, Laurent (2012). Lézards, crocodiles et tortues d'Afrique occidentale et du Sahara Paris: IRD Orstom. 503 pp. . (in French).

Acanthodactylus
Lacertid lizards of Africa
Reptiles of North Africa
Reptiles described in 1982
Taxa named by Alfredo Salvador (herpetologist)